C37 or C-37 may refer to:

Vehicles 
Aircraft
 Caudron C.37, a French passenger biplane
 Cessna C-37, an American civil utility aircraft
 Gulfstream Aerospace C-37A Gulfstream V, an American military VIP passenger jet
 Gulfstream Aerospace C-37B Gulfstream G550, an American military VIP passenger jet
 Lockheed C-37 Electra, an American military transport

Automobiles
 Dongfeng Sokon C37, a Chinese van
 Marshall C37, a British bus
 Sauber C37, a Swiss Formula One car

Ships
 Corsair 37, an American trimaran sailboat
 , a C-class submarine of the Royal Navy
 Catalina 37, a yacht produced by Catalina Yachts

Other uses 
 C37 road (Namibia)
 Caldwell 37, an open cluster
 King's Gambit, a chess opening
 Route C37 (Massachusetts), a street in Boston
 SARS-CoV-2 Lambda variant, also known as lineage C.37